Morrison v. Olson, 487 U.S. 654 (1988), was a Supreme Court of the United States decision that determined the Independent Counsel Act was constitutional. Morrison also set important precedent determining the scope of Congress's ability to encumber the President's authority to remove Officers of the United States from office. In Seila Law LLC v. Consumer Financial Protection Bureau (2020), the Supreme Court distinguished Morrison as a narrow exception applying only to inferior officers.

Over the years, the case has become at least as well known for its lone dissent by Justice Antonin Scalia.

Facts
The case involved subpoenas from two subcommittees of the United States House of Representatives that directed the Environmental Protection Agency (EPA) to produce documents relating to the efforts of the EPA and the Land and Natural Resources Division of the Justice Department to enforce the Superfund law. President Ronald Reagan ordered the Administrator of the EPA to withhold the documents on the grounds that they contained "enforcement sensitive information." This led to an investigation by the House Judiciary Committee that later produced a report suggesting that Theodore Olson - the Assistant Attorney General for the Office of Legal Counsel (the office created in Watergate's wake to handle ethical issues like these) - at the time - had given false and misleading testimony before a House subcommittee during the early parts of the investigation.

The Chairman of the Judiciary Committee forwarded a copy of the report to the Attorney General with a request that he seek the appointment of an independent counsel to investigate the allegations against Olson and two others. Alexia Morrison was named independent counsel and given jurisdiction to investigate whether Olson had violated federal law. Olson moved to quash the subpoenas and sued Morrison in her official capacity.

Olson argued that the Office of the Independent Counsel took executive powers away from the office of the President of the United States and created a hybrid "fourth branch" of government that was ultimately answerable to no one. He argued that the broad powers of an independent counsel could be easily abused or corrupted by partisanship. Morrison in turn argued that her position was necessary in order to prevent abuses by the executive branch, which historically operated in a closed environment.

Holding
The Court held that the independent counsel provision of the Ethics in Government Act did not violate the principle of separation of powers because it did not increase the power of one branch at the expense of another. Instead, even though the President (an executive office) cannot fire Independent Counsel, he still counts as an officer of the Executive branch, i.e. that is, he is not under the control of either the U.S. Congress or the courts.

Justice Scalia's dissent

Opinion 
Justice Scalia, the lone dissenter, said that the law should be struck down because (1) criminal prosecution is an exercise of "purely executive power" and (2) the law deprived the president of "exclusive control" of that power.

In his opinion, Scalia predicted how the law might be abused in practice, writing, "I fear the Court has permanently encumbered the Republic with an institution that will do it great harm." His discussion of the separation of powers affected by Morrison v. Olson is famous for its rhetorical comparison to other Supreme Court cases on separation of powers:

Scalia's dissent in Morrison vs. Olson is frequently cited as one of his most memorable and rhetorically powerful opinions, and it is considered by many to be at the top of the list.  Over time Scalia's lone dissent has become far more widely accepted as the correct view and likely helped lead to the 1999 Congressional vote to scuttle the independent counsel statute.

Agreement with the dissent from politicians and commentators 
Conservatives like Senator Bob Dole shared similar concerns when Lawrence Walsh announced the re-indictment of former defense secretary Caspar Weinberger on charges related to the Iran–Contra affair four days before the 1992 U.S. presidential election. Critics also sensed partisan politics when Walsh's office leaked a note suggesting President Bush Sr. had lied about his connections to the affair.

Concerns were also raised, in line with Scalia's dissent, when independent counsel Kenneth Starr spent $40 million and more than four years investigating President Clinton's land deals and extramarital affairs. Many believed the investigation was partisan.

Aftermath
Congress let the Independent Counsel Act expire in 1999. Then-Judge Samuel Alito said the decision hit the separation of powers doctrine 'about as hard as heavy-weight champ Mike Tyson usually hits his opponents.'" It seemingly "drove a stake into the heart of" Myers v. United States, the controlling case on presidential removal powers at that time. In 2013, Justice Scalia described Morrison v. Olson as the most wrenching case in which he had participated:

Probably the most wrenching was Morrison v. Olson, which involved the independent counsel. To take away the power to prosecute from the president and give it to somebody who's not under his control is a terrible erosion of presidential power. And it was wrenching not only because it came out wrong—I was the sole dissenter—but because the opinion was written by Rehnquist, who had been head of the Office of Legal Counsel, before me, and who I thought would realize the importance of that power of the president to prosecute. And he not only wrote the opinion; he wrote it in a manner that was more extreme than I think Bill Brennan would have written it. That was wrenching."In April 2006, a court citing Morrison rejected I. Lewis "Scooter" Libby's argument that Special Counsel Patrick J. Fitzgerald lacked the legal authority to bring charges against him. Morrison was distinguished in Seila Law LLC v. Consumer Financial Protection Bureau (2020) as being an exception to the President's generally unencumbered authority to remove officers of the United States at will. The Court held that Morrison's holding was a narrow exception only applying to inferior officers.

See also
 List of United States Supreme Court cases, volume 487
 List of United States Supreme Court cases
 Lists of United States Supreme Court cases by volume
 List of United States Supreme Court cases by the Rehnquist Court

References

Further reading

External links

United States Supreme Court cases
United States Supreme Court cases of the Rehnquist Court
United States separation of powers case law
Appointments Clause case law
United States administrative case law
1988 in the environment
1988 in United States case law
United States Environmental Protection Agency